Phocaea was an Ancient Greek city in Ionia.

Phocaea may also refer to: 
 25 Phocaea, one of the largest main belt asteroids
 Phocea, the plant genus Macaranga
 Phocea (yacht), a large sailing yacht